U-15 may refer to one of the following German submarines:

 , was a Type U 13 submarine launched in 1911 and that served in the First World War until sunk on 9 August 1914
 During the First World War, Germany also had these submarines with similar names:
 , a Type UB I submarine launched in 1915; transferred to Austria-Hungary on 14 June 1915 and became ; broken up in Pola in 1920
 , a Type UC I submarine launched in 1915 and lost in November 1916
 , a Type IIB submarine that served in the Second World War and was sunk on 30 January 1940
 , a Type 206 submarine of the Bundesmarine that was launched in 1974 and is still in service

U-15 or U-XV may also refer to:
 , a U-10 class submarine of the Austro-Hungarian Navy

Submarines of Germany